Jos van der Vleuten (7 February 1943 – 5 December 2011) was a Dutch professional road bicycle racer from 1965 to 1973.

Van der Vleuten was not a team leader, but usually rode his races helping his team mates, mainly Jan Janssen. The major result in his career was winning the points classification in the Vuelta a España in 1966, without winning any stage. He rode the race again in 1967, 1970 and 1972, each time winning one stage. Van de Vleuten also rode the Tour de France six times, never winning a stage.

After the 1967 UCI Road World Championships, where he finished in fifth place, Van der Vleuten tested positive for doping, and was disqualified.

References

External links 

1943 births
2011 deaths
Dutch male cyclists
Dutch Vuelta a España stage winners
Sportspeople from Helmond
UCI Road World Championships cyclists for the Netherlands
Cyclists from North Brabant